The 1931–32 season was Manchester United's 36th season in the Football League.

The season saw Herbert Bamlett sacked as manager on 9 November 1931 after a dismal run of form in the league, and Walter Crickmer recruited as his successor on the same day. United recovered well in the league after his appointment and finished 12th, banishing fears of a second successive relegation which would have pushed them into the Third Division North for the first time. At the end of the season Scott Duncan replaced Walter Crickmer as the full-time manager.

Second Division

FA Cup

References

Manchester United F.C. seasons
Manchester United